Hilarion (secular name Grigory Valerievich Alfeyev, ; 24 July 1966) is a bishop of the Russian Orthodox Church and the current metropolitan of Budapest and Hungary. He is also a noted theologian, church historian and composer and has published books on dogmatic theology, patristics and church history as well as numerous compositions for choir and orchestra.
  
During 2009-2022 he was the titular metropolitan of Volokolamsk, the chairman of the Department for External Church Relations of the Moscow Patriarchate and a permanent member of the Holy Synod of the Russian Orthodox Church and rector of the church-wide postgraduate and doctoral studies named after Saints Cyril and Methodius Equal to the Apostles.

In June 2022, following a meeting of the Holy Synod of the Russian Orthodox Church, Hilarion was removed from his position as president of the Department of External Church Relations of the Patriarchate of Moscow and dismissed as Metropolitan of Volokolamsk. He was appointed to the Metropolis of Budapest-Hungary.

Biography
Grigoriy Valerievich Alfeyev was born on 24 July 1966 in Moscow. From 1972 to 1982 he studied violin, piano and composition at the Moscow Gnessins School and from 1983 to 1986 at the Moscow State Conservatoire.  From 1984 to 1986 he served in the Soviet military.

In January 1987, after serving in the military, he became a monk (see below under Church activity). In 1989 graduated from the Moscow Theological Seminary and in 1991 from the Moscow Theological Academy with the degree of Master of Theology.

From 1991 to 1993 he taught homiletics, dogmatic theology, New Testament studies and Byzantine Greek at the Moscow Theological Academy, St Tikhon's Theological Institute and St John the Theologian's Orthodox University.

From 1993 to 1995 he studied at the University of Oxford (UK) under the supervision of Bishop Kallistos Ware. In 1995 he completed his doctoral thesis on "St Symeon the New Theologian and Orthodox Tradition" and was awarded the degree of Doctor of Philosophy.

Church activity

In January 1987 he entered the Monastery of the Holy Spirit in Vilnius, Lithuania, where he was tonsured as a monk on 19 June, ordained a deacon on 21 June and ordained priest on 19 August in the same year. Until 1991 he served as a parish priest in Lithuania, including two years as dean of Annunciation Cathedral in Kaunas.

From 1995 to 2001 Alfeyev served as Secretary for Inter-Christian Affairs of the Department for External Church Relations of the Moscow Patriarchate. He also taught part-time at Smolensk and Kaluga Theological Seminaries (Russia), at St Vladimir's and St Herman's Theological Seminary (USA) and at Cambridge University (UK).

On 27 December 2001 he was nominated bishop. On 14 January 2002 he was consecrated by Alexy II, Patriarch of Moscow and all Russia, and 10 other hierarchs.

Appointed Assistant (Vicar) Bishop in the Diocese of Sourozh in the UK, but as a result of an acute conflict situation around him and at Metropolitan Anthony's request, the Holy Synod decided, only a few months later, on 17 July 2002, that he was to be transferred and nominated as Head of the Representation of the Russian Orthodox Church to the European Institutions in Brussels.

On 7 May 2003 appointed Bishop of Vienna and Austria, administrator of the Diocese of Budapest and Hungary, in addition to his position in Brussels, which he continues to hold.

On March 31, 2009, appointed the Bishop of Volokolamsk, the Vicar to the Patriarch of Moscow and all Russia, the chairman of the Department of the External Church Relations (the position previously held by the current Patriarch Kirill), and a permanent member of the Holy Synod, ex officio.

On Easter Monday, 2009 was raised to an archbishop by Patriarch Kirill during the Divine Liturgy in The Dormition Cathedral of the Moscow Kremlin. On 1 February 2010, at a Liturgy to celebrate the first anniversary of the enthronement of Patriarch Kirill of Moscow and All Russia,  he was raised to the rank of Metropolitan.

In late 2018, Alfeyev visited North Korea, meeting with officials and leading a service at the Church of the Life-Giving Trinity in Pyongyang.

Views on the nature of the Orthodox Church

In an interview given on 19 July 2010, Alfeyev said: "The Orthodox Church as a whole does not have a unified structural or administrative format. Administratively, it is, if one can say so, a confederation of autocephalous, that is, completely independent of one another, Orthodox Churches. (...) Problems arising in relations between Orthodox Churches are not theological or dogmatic in nature, but rather pertaining, for instance, to who should govern particular territories. Historically, some regions in different times were parts of different Local Churches. And today there may be two Churches who claim a particular region. (...) In the 1990s, we had a very difficult streak in relations with the Patriarchate of Constantinople, who unilaterally created its own church jurisdiction in our canonical territory, namely, in Estonia. It happened because in the 20s and 30s the Estonian Orthodox Church was temporarily part of the Patriarchate of Constantinople. Because of this, our relations with Constantinople were suspended for several months. They were restored later but remained tense. The Estonian problem still exists but recently His Holiness Patriarch Kirill has made some steps towards the Patriarchate of Constantinople for the express purpose of relieving the tension (...)."

In general, opinions on such matters among Orthodox Christians vary.

Scholarly work

Alfeyev is the author of more than a thousand publications, including fourteen monographs in English: St Symeon the New Theologian and Orthodox Tradition (Oxford University Press, 2000), welcomed by the press, The Spiritual World of Isaac the Syrian (Cistercian Publications, Kalamazoo, MI, 2000), The Mystery of Faith. An Introduction to the Teaching and Spirituality of the Orthodox Church (Darton, Longman and Todd, 2002), Orthodox Witness Today (WCC Publications, 2006), 
Christ the Conqueror of Hell. The Descent into Hell in Orthodox Tradition (St Vladimir's Press, 2009), Orthodox Christianity, vol. 1-5 (St Vladimir's Press, 2011–19), Prayer: Encounter with the Living God (St Vladimir's Press, 2015), Jesus Christ, His Life and Teaching, vols. I-IV (St Vladimir's Press, 2019–21). His books have also been translated into French, Italian, Spanish, Portuguese, German, Greek, Serbian, Finnish, Hungarian, Polish, Romanian, Arabic, Japanese, Chinese, Ukrainian, Bulgarian, Macedonian, Czech, Swedish, Estonian, Georgian, Armenian (see below).

Apart from his doctoral degree in philosophy from Oxford, Alfeyev also holds a doctorate in theology from St. Sergius Orthodox Theological Institute in Paris, which was awarded to him in 1999. In February 2005 he was elected a privat-dozent of the University of Fribourg (Switzerland).

Musical activity
Alfeyev is author of numerous musical compositions. His St Matthew Passion, grand oratorio for soloists, choir and orchestra, received a standing ovation at its performances at the Great Hall of Moscow Conservatory (27 March 2007), at the Auditorium Conciliazione, Rome (29 March 2007), and at St Patrick's Cathedral, Melbourne (28 September 2007). Equally well received was his Christmas Oratorio, performed in Washington, Boston and New York (18–20 December 2007) and later in Moscow (7 and 15 January 2008) and his Stabat Mater (world premiere in January 2012 under the direction of Vladimir Spivakov). On the other hand, a Washington Post review described a 2011 performance of the Oratorio as "banal music that seemed the Russian equivalent of the cheesy carol arrangements by John Rutter". Other critics, however, are more favorable to Alfeyev's music, noting that "while they’re not on the level of Johann Sebastian Bach, the compositions are sophisticated, and they’re easy on the ear." Some go even further by stating that "the music of composer Hilarion (Alfeyev) is bright, powerful and rigorous, but at the same time it is distinguished by the subtlest lyricism... His compositions penetrate a human soul; they are clear and accessible to everyone." It has also been repeatedly argued that Alfeyev is "one of the most widely performed of all living Russian composers". His music has been performed at concerts more than 300 times in 15 years, in Russia and abroad.

Ecumenical activity

Alfeyev was a member of the Executive and Central Cwitommittees of the World Council of Churches, of the Presidium of 'Faith and Order' Commission, as well as of numerous bilateral theological dialogues. In 1998 he headed the 5-member Moscow Patriarchate delegation to the 8th WCC Assembly in Harare, and in February 2006 headed the Moscow Patriarchate's 21-member delegation to the 9th Assembly in Porto Alegre.

Alfeyev was a member of the Joint International Commissions for the Theological Dialogue between the Eastern Orthodox Church and the Catholic Church, between the Eastern Orthodox Church and the Anglican Communion, and between the Eastern Orthodox Church and the World Alliance of Reformed Churches. He is also interested in interfaith dialogue among all major world religions, and currently sits on the Board of World Religious Leaders for the Elijah Interfaith Institute.

On 10 October 2007, Alfeyev walked out of an important meeting of the Orthodox-Catholic International Theological Commission  at Ravenna, in protest against the choice of delegates by the Ecumenical Patriarchate. His action was approved by the Holy Synod of the Russian Orthodox Church.

On 5 October 2008, Alfeyev took part in the "Bible marathon" organized by the Italian state TV channel RAI-Uno. He read Chapter Two from the Book of Genesis, immediately following Pope Benedict XVI, who read Chapter One. Alfeyev was followed by 1246 readers from various countries.

In September 2009, at the invitation of Cardinal Walter Kasper, he visited Pope Benedict XVI and several officials of the Roman Curia who have key roles in Catholic ecumenical dialogue.

Late in 2010, Alfeyev spoke to senior Anglican bishops and professors at the Nikean Club dinner at Lambeth Palace, criticizing proposals for the ordination of women as bishops and the toleration of homosexual activity by some Anglicans.

In April 2017, he expressed his approval of the Supreme Court of Russia's decision to allow a ban of the worship of Jehovah's Witnesses in the Russian Federation. He claims that "they erode the psyche of people and the family" (e.g. disfellowshiping), and that those Witnesses' beliefs which do not coincide with those of the Orthodox Church, such as the rejection of the doctrine of the Trinity, are reason to outlaw their religion.

Honours and awards
 Order of Friendship (20 July 2011) – for outstanding contribution to the development of spiritual culture and strengthening friendship between peoples
 Order of Merit (17 May 2016) – for outstanding contribution to the development of spiritual culture and strengthening friendship between peoples
 Order of Alexander Nevsky (18 May 2021) – for outstanding contribution to the international and inter-confessional relations
 National Award in Literature and Art (9 June 2021) – for contribution to the development of national culture and educational activities
 Medal of January 13 (Lithuania, March 4, 1992)
 Order of Merit (Ukraine, 27 July 2013) – for outstanding personal contribution to the development of spirituality and church work of many years
 Order of Merit, Commander's Cross (Hungary, 16 December 2013) – for his contribution to the strengthening of inter-Christian dialogue, the protection of Christians in the modern world, the upholding of the fundamental moral principles of the Holy Scriptures, the defense of the institution of the family, outstanding achievements in the ecclesiastical and diplomatic mission, as well as for the work to deepen cooperation between the historical Churches of Hungary and the Russian Orthodox Church
 Order of Merit, Commander's Cross with Star (Hungary, 2019) – for the tireless proclamation of the value of Christianity and its power in uniting the community, for attracting the younger generation to these values, for ecclesiastical and diplomatic work and for promoting international cooperation of Christian communities
 Order of St. Innocent of Moscow, 2nd degree (Orthodox Church in America), 2009)
 Sigillum Magnum – Gold Medal (University of Bologna, Italy, 2010)
 Order of the Holy Apostle and Evangelist Mark, 2nd class (Orthodox Church of Alexandria, 2010)
 Order of Saints Cyril and Methodius, a gold star (Orthodox Church of the Czech Lands and Slovakia, 2011)
 Order of the Holy Apostles Peter and Paul, 2nd class (Antiochian Orthodox Church, 2011)
 Order of St Mary Magdalene, 2nd degree (Orthodox Church of Poland, 2012)
 Order of St Apostle Paul, a gold cross (Orthodox Church of Greece, 2013)
 Order of St Savvas, 2nd degree (Serbian Orthodox Church, 2014)
 Order of Saints Cyril and Methodius, 1st degree (Bulgarian Orthodox Church, 2014)
 Order of St Alexis, Metropolitan of Moscow, 2nd degree (Russian Orthodox Church, 2016)
 Order of St Prince Daniel of Moscow, 2nd degree (Russian Orthodox Church, 2019)
 Order of St Sergius of Radonezh, 2nd degree (Russian Orthodox Church, 2021)
 Honorary doctorates of the St. Petersburg Theological Academy (2011), the Minsk Theological Academy (2012), the St. Vladimir Theological Seminary in New York (USA, 2014), the Russian State Social University (2010), the Faculty of Theology of Catalonia (Spain, 2010), the Faculty of Theology of the University of Lugano (Switzerland, 2011), the Presov University (Slovakia, 2011), the Villanova University (USA, 2012), the Nashotah House Theological Seminary (USA, 2012), the Institute of Theology of the Belarusian State University (2013), the Russian State University for the Humanities (2014), the Veliko Trnovo University of Saints Cyril and Methodius (Bulgaria, 2014), the Moscow State Linguistic University (2017), the Faculty of Theology of Puglia (Italy, 2017).
 Honorary professorships of the Russian Christian Humanitarian Academy (2010), the Ural State Conservatory (2012), the Ural State Mining University (2012), the Moscow State Pedagogical University (2017), the Lomonosov Moscow State University (2018).

Selected discography 
 Metropolitan Hilarion Alfeyev. St Matthew Passion. Tchaikovsky Symphony Orchestra of Moscow Radio. Conductor Vladimir Fedoseyev. 2 CD. Relief Publisher (2011). CR 991094.
 Metropolitan Hilarion Alfeyev. St Matthew Passion. Tchaikovsky Symphony Orchestra, Moscow Synodal Choir. Conductor Vladimir Fedoseyev. 2 CD. Vista Vera (2012). ASIN: B008J3ME8G.
 Metropolitan Hilarion Alfeyev. St Matthew Passion. Tchaikovsky Symphony Orchestra, Moscow Synodal Choir. Conductor Vladimir Fedoseyev. 2 CD. Melodiya Recordings (2014).
 Metropolitan Hilarion Alfeyev. De Profundis. Compositions for orchestra and choir. Stabat Mater, Concerto grosso, Fugue on the B-A-C-H motif, Canciones de la muerte, De profundis. Moscow Synodal Choir, Russian National Orchestra. Conducted by Metropolitan Hilarion Alfeyev. PENTATONE PTC 5186486 (2015).
 Metropolitan Hilarion Alfeyev. Stabat Mater/A Song of Ascents/Christmas Oratorio. National Philharmonic Orchestra of Russia. Conductor Vladimir Spivakov. 2 CD. MEL CD 1002419. Melodiya Recordings (2016).
 Metropolitan Hilarion Alfeyev. The Divine Liturgy. SVS Press (2016). .
 Bach. Ich ruf' zu Dir, Herr Jesu Christ. Russian National Orchestra. Conductor Metropolitan Hilarion Alfeyev. Soloist Stephan Genz. PENTATONE PTC 5186593 (2017).
 Metropolitan Hilarion Alfeyev. Music for Orchestra and Choir. 6 CD. MEL CD 1002473. Melodiya Recordings (2017).
 Metropolitan Hilarion Alfeyev. St Matthew Passion. English Version. Moscow Synodal Choir, Russian National Orchestra. Conductor Metropolitan Hilarion Alfeyev. 2 CD. MEL CD 1002531. Melodiya Recordings (2020).
 Metropolitan Hilarion Alfeyev. Liturgical Chants. Masters of Choral Singing. Conductor Lev Kontorovich. MEL CD 1002681. Melodiya Recordings (2022).
 Brahms. Variations on a Theme by Haydn & Symphony No. 4. The Moscow State Symphony Orchestra. Conductor Metropolitan Hilarion Alfeyev. MEL CD 1002683. Melodiya Recordings (2022).

Bibliography
Books only:

In English 
 .
 .
 .
 .
 .
 .
 .
 .
 .
 .
 .
 .
 .
 .

In Russian 
 .
 .
 . 
 .
 .
 .
 .
 .
 .
 .
 .
 .
 .
 .
 .
 .
 .
 .
 .
 .
 .
 .
 .
 .
 .
 .
 .
 .
 .
 .
 .
 .
 .
 .
 .
 .
 .
 .
 .

In French 
 Le mystère de la foi. Introduction à la théologie dogmatique orthodoxe. Paris: Cerf, 2001.
 L’univers spirituel d’Isaac le Syrien. Bellefontaine, 2001.
 Syméon le Studite. Discours ascétique. Introduction, texte critique et notes par H. Alfeyev. Sources Chrétiennes 460. Paris: Cerf, 2001.
 Le chantre de la lumière. Initiation à la spiritualité de saint Grégoire de Nazianze. Paris: Cerf, 2006.
 Le Nom grand et glorieux. La vénération du Nom de Dieu et la prière de Jésus dans la tradition orthodoxe. Paris: Cerf, 2007.
 Le mystère sacré de l’Eglise. Introduction à l’histoire et à la problématique des débats athonites sur la vénération du Nom de Dieu. Fribourg: Academic Press, 2007.
 L’Orthodoxie I. L’histoire et structures canoniques de l’Eglise orthodoxe. Paris: Cerf, 2009.
 L’Orthodoxie II. La doctrine de l’Eglise orthodoxe. Paris: Cerf, 2012.
 Image de l’Invisible. L’art dans l'Église orthodoxe. Paris: Les Éditions Sainte-Geneviève, 2017.
 Le sermon sur la montagne. Paris: Syrtes, 2018.
 Le début de l'Évangile. Paris: Syrtes, 2021.

In Italian 
 La gloria del Nome. L’opera dello schimonaco Ilarion e la controversia athonita sul Nome di Dio all’inizio dell XX secolo. Bose: Qiqajon, 2002.
 La forza dell’amore. L’universo spirituale di sant’Isacco il Syro. Bose: Qiqajon, 2003.
 Cristo Vincitore degli inferi. Bose: Qiqajon, 2003.
 Cristiani nel mondo contemporaneo. Bose: Qiqajon, 2013.
 La Chiesa ortodossa. 1. Profilo storico. Bologna: Edizione Dehoniane, 2013.
 La Chiesa ortodossa. 2. Dottrina. Bologna: Edizione Dehoniane, 2014.
 La Chiesa ortodossa. 3. Tempio, icona e musica sacra. Bologna: Edizione Dehoniane, 2015.
 La Chiesa ortodossa. 4. Liturgia. Bologna: Edizione Dehoniane, 2017.
 La Chiesa ortodossa. 5. Sacramenti e riti. Bologna: Edizione Dehoniane, 2018.
 L’icona: Arte, bellezza e mistero. Bologna: Edizione Dehoniane, 2018.
 Il mistero della fede. Tesori di spiritualità ortodossa. Milano: Monasterium, 2019.
 Il discorso della montagna— Gesù Cristo. Vita e insegnamento II. Milano: San Paolo, 2019.
 Morte e resurrezione— Gesù Cristo. Vita e insegnamento VI. Milano: San Paolo, 2020.
 L’inizio del Vangelo.— Gesù Cristo. Vita e insegnamento I. Milano: San Paolo, 2021.

In other languages 
 El misterio de la fe. Una introduction a la Teologia Ortodoxa. Granada: Nuevo Inicio, 2014.
 Cristianismo ortodoxo I: Historia y estructura canónica de la Iglesia Ortodoxa. Mexico: Barek, 2022.
 Mistério da fé. Introdução à teologia dogmática ortodoxa. Lisboa, 2018.
 O Futuro do Cristianismo. Lisboa: Lucerna, 2019.
 Geheimnis des Glaubens. Einführung in die orthodoxe dogmatische Theologie. Aus dem Russischen übersetzt von Hermann-Josef Röhrig. Herausgegeben von Barbara Hallensleben und Guido Vergauwen. Universitätsverlag Freiburg Schweiz, 2003. 2. Ausgabe — Fribourg: Academic Press, 2005.
 Traditionen in der Orthodoxen Kirche]. Münsterschwarzach: Vier-Türme-Verlag, 2012.
 Die Zukunft der Tradition. Gesellschaft, Familie, Christentum. Berlin: Landt, 2016.
 Katechismus. Kurze Wegbegleitung durch den orthodoxen Glauben. Münster: Aschendorff Verlag, 2017.
 Άγιος Ισαάκ ο Σύρος. Ο πνευματικός του κόσμος. Αγιολογική Βιβλιοθήκη, αρ. 17. Εκδόσεις ΑΚΡΙΤΑΣ. Αθήνα, 2005.
 Το μυστήριο της Πίστης. Εκδόσεις ΕΝ ΠΛΩ. Αθήνα, 2011.
 Тајна вере: увод у православно догматско богословље. Превод са руског Ђорђе Лазаревић; редактор превода Ксенија Кончаревић. Краљево: Епархијски управни одбор Епархије жичке, 2005.
 Ви сте светлост свету. Беседе о хришћанском животу. Са руског превео Никола Стојановић. Редактура превода проф. др Ксенија Кончаревић. Краљево, 2009.
 Живот и учење светог Григорија Богослова. Превод Никола Стојановић. Редактура превода др Ксенија Кончаревић, проф. Краљево, 2009.
 Христос Победитељ ада. Тема силаска у ад у источно-хришћанском предању. Са руског превела Марија Дабетић. Крагујевац, 2010.
 Православно богословље на размећу векова. Са руског превела Марија Дабетић. Крагујевац, 2011.
 Патријарх Кирил: живот и гледиште. Превод Ксенија Кончаревић. Београд, 2012.
 Духовни свет преподобног Исака Сирина. Превела са руског др Ксенија Кончаревић. Нови Сад: Беседа, 2017.
 У шта верују православни хришћани. C руског превео епископ моравички Антоније (Пантелић). Београд, 2019.
 Uskon mysteeri. Johdatus ortodoksiseen dogmaattiseen teologiaan. Ortodoksisen kirjallisuuden julkaisuneuvosto. Jyväskylä, 2002.
 A hit titka. Bevezetés az Ortodox Egyház teológiájába és lelkiségébe. Budapest: Magyar Ortodox Egyházmegye, 2005.
 Az imádságról. Budapest: Kairosz Kiadó, 2017.
 Katekizmus. Rövid útmutató az ortodox hithez. Fordította: Sipos Barnabás, Zimonyi Irina. Budapest, 2019.
 Mysterium wiary. Wprowadzenie do prawosławnej teologii dogmatycznej. Warszawska Metropolia Prawosławna, 2009.
 Hristos, biruitorul iadului. Coborarea la iad din perspectiva teologica. Bucureşti: Editura Sophia, 2008.
 Sfântul Simeon Noul Teolog şi traditia ortodoxa. Bucureşti: Editura Sophia, 2009.
 Lumea duhovnicească a Sfântului Isaac Firul. Iaşi: Editura Doxologia, 2013.
 Taina credinței. Introducere în teologia dogmatică ortodoxă. Iaşi: Editura Doxologia, 2014.
 Rugăciunea. Întălnire cu Dumnezeul cel Viu]. Iaşi: Editura Doxologia, 2016.
 Taina Sfântă Bisericii. Introducere în istoria şi problematica disputelor iciaslave. Kluj-Napoca: Editura Renaşterea, 2021.
 
 
 
 
 正教導師談祈禱卅二講 貝 伊拉里翁總主教 電視演講， 愛西里爾 譯 2009 年
 作者 都主教伊拉里雍 阿爾菲耶夫 正信奧義 China Orthodox Press 2015 年
 教理問答 正教信仰指南 China Orthodox Press 2020 年
 Таїнство віри: Вступ до православного богослов’я]. Київ, 2009.
 Про молитву. Київ, 2015.
 Тайнството на вярата. Увод в православното богословие. София, 2014.
 Тајната на верата. Вовед во православното догматско богословие. Скопје, 2009.
 Izák Syrský a jeho duchovní odkaz. Přel. Jaroslav Brož a Michal Řoutil. Praha, Červený Kostelec: Nakladatelství Pavel Mervart, 2010.
 Kristus — vítěz nad podsvětím: téma sestoupení do pekel ve východokřesťanské tradici. Přeložil: Antonín Čížek. Praha, Červený Kostelec: Nakladatelství Pavel Mervart, 2013.
 Mystérium víry. Uvedení do pravoslavné teologie. Překlad: Antonín Čížek. Praha, Červený Kostelec: Nakladatelství Pavel Mervart, 2016.
 Trons mysterium. En introduktion till den ortodoxa kyrkans troslära och andlighet. Stockholm: Artos & Norma Bokförlag, 2010.
 Usu saladus. Sissejuhatus õigeusu teoloogiasse]. Tallinn, 2017.
 სარწმუნოების საიდუმლოება. თბილისი, 2013.
 Հիսուս Քրիստոս. Կենսագրություն. Երեւան, 2022 թ.

Musical compositions
 .
 .
 .
 .
 .
 .
 .
 ; première under the direction of Vladimir Spivakov.
 .

Notes

References

External links

 .
 .
 .
 .
 .
 .

1966 births
Living people
Musicians from Moscow
Russian theologians
Eastern Orthodox theologians
Eastern Orthodox monks
Russian composers
Russian male composers
Bishops of the Russian Orthodox Church
20th-century Eastern Orthodox theologians
21st-century Eastern Orthodox theologians
21st-century Eastern Orthodox archbishops
Critics of Jehovah's Witnesses
Eastern Orthodoxy in Hungary
Eastern Orthodox bishops in Europe